Kojima Engineering was a Japanese Formula One constructor who entered cars in the Japanese Grand Prix in 1976 and 1977.

The team was founded in 1976 by Matsuhisa Kojima. Kojima had made a fortune importing bananas, and was a motor-racing enthusiast, having ridden in Motocross himself in the 1960s. He began entering Formula Two cars in Japan, and struck a deal with Dunlop to supply tyres for the 1976 Japanese Grand Prix. To go with these, the company constructed the KE007 chassis, and brought in several staff-members from the Maki team. They helped arrange an entry for the Grand Prix at Fuji, and a Cosworth DFV engine.

The car was tested throughout the autumn of 1976, with Masahiro Hasemi, a Japanese Formula 2 driver, at the wheel. Hasemi then scored a huge stir at the Japanese Grand Prix, posting 4th best time in the first qualifying session. However, he crashed in the second session, and the car had to be rebuilt virtually from scratch. Hasemi started 10th, and ran superbly before tyre trouble led to an eventual 11th place. He was initially credited with fastest lap, but this was a measurement mistake, and, several days later, the circuit issued a press release to correct the fastest lap holder of the race to Jacques Laffite.

A planned entry into the 1977 South American races was cancelled, but the team built a new Kojima KE009 for the 1977 Japanese Grand Prix. Bridgestone this time supplied the tyres, but these were unsatisfactory, and Noritake Takahara started only 19th before crashing avoiding debris. A second KE009 was entered by Heros Racing for the same race, Kazuyoshi Hoshino starting and finishing 11th.

Kojima continued as an F2 entrant until the late 1980s, but did not venture again beyond domestic racing.

Complete Formula One World Championship results
(key) (results in italics indicate fastest lap)

Notes 
 It was initially announced that the fastest lap at the 1976 Japanese Grand Prix was set by Masahiro Hasemi in a Kojima, but this was a measurement mistake, and, several days later, the circuit issued a press release to correct the fastest lap holder of the race to Jacques Laffite in a Ligier. This release was promptly made known in Japan, and the Japan Automobile Federation (JAF) and Japanese media corrected the record. But this correction was not made well known outside Japan, thus, Kojima is credited with one fastest lap in many record books.

References 

 Kojima Formula One Cars

Formula One constructors
Formula One entrants
Japanese auto racing teams
Japanese racecar constructors
Auto racing teams established in 1976